Crasso is a surname. Notable people with the surname include:
 Francesco Crasso (1500–1566),  Italian Roman Catholic cardinal
 Rodrigo Crasso (born 1987), Brazilian footballer